George Greenfield can refer to:

 George Greenfield (cricketer) (1843-1917), English cricketer
 George Greenfield (footballer) (1908-1981), English footballer
 George Greenfield (gymnast) (born 1948), American Olympic gymnast